The following articles contain the following lists of National Hockey League (NHL) records:

List of NHL records (individual)
List of NHL records (team)
List of NHL All-Star Game records
List of NHL statistical leaders
List of NHL statistical leaders by country